Wrattens Forest is a locality in the Gympie Region, Queensland, Australia.

Geography 

The entire locality is a protected area. Most of it is within the Wrattens National Park, but some areas are in within the Wrattens Conservation Park, the Wrattens State Forest and the Wrattens Resources Reserve.

History 
The locality was named after forest overseer Bill Wratten, who worked at state forests at Cherbourg and Wondai.

A new Wrattens Conservation Park was also established surrounding the Barambah Environmental Education Centre.

Education 
Barambah Environmental Education Centre is an Outdoor and Environmental Education Centre at 301 A Flat Road.

Originally established as 'A' Flat Forestry Camp in 1945, the site housed Forestry workers who were employed in the Kabunga Nursery growing and also planting Hoop Pine in the forest plantations at Jimmy's Scrub and 'A' Flat.

The Department of Education acquired the site in 1977 and named it the Mary River Field Study Centre. Facilities at the Centre in 1977 were very basic with an office, a corrugated iron walled dining room with an open fireplace for cooking meals and three wooden sleeping quarters. There were no gardens and only a few trees in the Centre grounds.

In 1980 the Centre was renamed the Barambah Field Study Centre and in 1988 it was renamed the Barambah Environmental Education Centre.

In the 1990s the old Gallangowan school was moved to the Centre and is used as the office and staff room.

As at 2019, the Centre has native gardens and established trees. An extensive plant nursery, with three hot houses and a large fenced hardening area has also been established.  The dining room and kitchen facilities have been updated and easily cater for all groups who utilise the Centre, which has the capacity to sleep 75 people.

References

Attribution 
This Wikipedia article contains material from Barambah Environmental Education Centre: About Us. Published by The State of Queensland under CC-BY-4.0 licence, accessed on 29 May 2019.

Gympie Region
Localities in Queensland